Roshan Din Junejo (born 1 January 1951) is a Pakistani politician who has been a member of the National Assembly of Pakistan, since August 2018. Previously, he was a member of the National Assembly from 2008 to May 2018.

Early life
He was born on 1 January 1951.

Political career

He was elected to the National Assembly of Pakistan as a candidate of Pakistan Peoples Party (PPP) from Constituency NA-236 (Sanghar-II) in 2008 Pakistani general election. He received 90,311 votes and defeated Jam Mashooq Ali, a candidate of Pakistan Muslim League (F) (PML-F).

He was re-elected to the National Assembly as a candidate of PPP from Constituency NA-236 (Sanghar-II) in 2013 Pakistani general election. He received 100,906 votes and defeated Imamuddin Shouqeen, a candidate of PML-F.

He was re-elected to the National Assembly as a candidate of PPP from Constituency NA-217 (Sanghar-III) in 2018 Pakistani general election.

References

Living people
Pakistan People's Party politicians
Sindhi people
Pakistani MNAs 2013–2018
People from Sindh
1951 births
Pakistani MNAs 2008–2013
Pakistani MNAs 2018–2023